Sweatshop is an album by American jazz guitarist Joe Morris released in 1990 on his own Riti label. It features a trio with Jerome Deupree, who was the original drummer in the rock band Morphine, and bassist Sebastian Steinberg. It was the first part of what Morris calls "Big Loud Electric Guitar" experiments, a mix of funk, rock, noise and collective improvisation.

Reception

In his review for AllMusic, Thom Jurek states "In all, this is one of Morris' least-original (in terms of personal signature) works in a sense, but the ensemble playing is so deft, tight, and meaty, it is easily as enjoyable as his more groundbreaking later recordings."

Track listing
All compositions by Joe Morris
 "Four Pets" – 7:41 
 "The Oky Doke" – 5:00
 "Fit Fit" – 6:24
 "Teeming Millions" – 9:12
 "World Iz Big" – 7:16
 "What's What" – 7:40
 "Well Put" – 8:22
 "Are You Warm Now?" – 10:27
 "Slow Learner" – 7:58

Personnel
Joe Morris – guitar
 Sebastian Steinberg – electric bass
 Jerome Deupree – drums

References

1990 albums
Joe Morris (guitarist) albums